The Perth International Track Cycling Grand Prix is an Australia track cycling competition, held at the Perth SpeedDome in Perth, Western Australia. First held in 2000, the event has received UCI category 3 status, allowing UCI points to be allocated to countries endeavouring to gain sufficient points to qualify for the UCI Track Cycling World Championships since 2009. The events registered with the UCI are: Sprint, Keirin, Points Race and Scratch Race (both men's and women's).

Men's

Sprint

Keirin

Points race

Scratch race

Women's

Points race

Scratch race

Sprint

Keirin

Sources

References

External links
 Official website
 2009 Pert International Track Cycling Grand Prix video's on YouTube

Cycling in Perth, Western Australia
Women's cycle races
Defunct cycling races in Australia
Recurring sporting events established in 2000
2000 establishments in Australia
2012 disestablishments in Australia
Recurring sporting events disestablished in 2012
Track cycling races
International cycle races hosted by Australia